is a member of the Liberal Democratic Party. He was the Minister of Health, Labour and Welfare in Japan (2006–2007), and was a member of the House of Representatives from 1980 to 2009. His constituency was Shizuoka Prefecture 3rd District.

In January 2007, he drew criticism for describing women as "birth-giving machines" and "baby making devices" in a speech on the falling birthrate of Japan. He said later "it was extremely sound to have more than two children".

He believes in Tenrikyo.

Career 
He is from the city of Fukuroi in Shizuoka Prefecture. He graduated from the Faculty of Law at the University of Tokyo in 1961. In 1980 he was elected to the House of Representatives for the first time, and has been elected eight times since. He was the Parliamentary Secretary for Foreign Affairs from July 1994 until August 1995, and the Chairman of the Committee on Health and Welfare from March 1998 to July 1998.

In July 1998 he was appointed to be the Minister of State for the National Land Agency by Prime Minister Keizō Obuchi, and became the Minister of State for Financial Reconstruction in October of that year. He was the Minister of State and Chairman of the Financial Reconstruction Commission from December 1998 to October 1999. He then reprised that role from December 2000 to January 2001. He was the Minister of State for Financial Services from January 2001 to September 2002, when he stepped down due to a disagreement with the minister in charge of economic and fiscal policy, Heizō Takenaka.  He was the Chairman of the Research Commission on the Tax System for the LDP from November 2005 to September 2006. He became the Minister of Health, Labour and Welfare in September 2006. He was a member of the Liberal Democratic Party, belonging specifically to the Kōchikai (Koga faction).

In August 2009, Yanagisawa ran for reelection to represent Shizuoka's 3rd district House of Representatives, but was defeated by Nobuhiro Koyama. Yanagisawa thereafter retired from politics and accepted a post as the president of Josai International University.

References 

|-

|-

|-

|-

|-

|-

|-

|-

1935 births
Living people
Politicians from Shizuoka Prefecture
University of Tokyo alumni
Tenrikyo
Members of the House of Representatives (Japan)
Ministers of Health, Labour and Welfare of Japan
Liberal Democratic Party (Japan) politicians
21st-century Japanese politicians